Sven Peter is a German bobsledder who competed in the late 1990s and early 2000s. He won three medals in the four-man event at the FIBT World Championships and European championships, with a gold and silver in 2001 and a bronze in 1996.

References

German male bobsledders
Living people
Year of birth missing (living people)